The 2014–15 Charlotte 49ers women's basketball team represents the University of North Carolina at Charlotte during the 2014–15 NCAA Division I women's basketball season. The 49ers, led by third year head coach Cara Consuegra, play their home games at Dale F. Halton Arena and were members of Conference USA. They finished the season 15–17, 10–8 in C-USA play to finish in a tie for seventh place. They advanced to the quarterfinals of the C-USA women's tournament where they lost to WKU.

Roster

Rankings

Schedule

|-
!colspan=9 style="background:#00703C; color:#FFFFFF;"| Exhibition

|-
!colspan=9 style="background:#00703C; color:#FFFFFF;"| Regular season

|-
!colspan=9 style="background:#00703C; color:#FFFFFF;"| Conference USA Tournament

See also
2014–15 Charlotte 49ers men's basketball team

References

Charlotte 49ers women's basketball seasons
Charlotte